This page lists the World Best Year Performances in the year 1981 in the Men's Hammer Throw. (The women did not compete in the hammer throw until the early 1990s.) The world record was broken in the previous (1980) year by Soviet Union's Yuriy Sedykh at the 1980 Summer Olympics in Moscow, Soviet Union.

Records

1981 World Year Ranking

References
digilander.libero
apulanta
hammerthrow.wz

1981
Hammer Throw Year Ranking, 1981